David Greenspan (born 1956) is an American actor and playwright. He is the recipient of six Obies, including an award in 2010 for Sustained Achievement.

Life

Greenspan was born in 1956 in Los Angeles, California.  He holds a B.A. in Drama from the University of California at Irvine. He lives in New York City with his long-time partner, painter William Kennon.

Career
"A classicist in experimental clothing, David Greenspan is a playwright who is also passionately involved in the theatre as an actor and director. From his early more autobiographical plays (one of which, Principia, took inspiration from the shifting modalities of Joyce’s Ulysses) to more recent works inspired by (and at times adapted from the work of) Hawthorne, Stein, Molnar, and Thorton Wilder, Greenspan’s theatre is a place where anything can happen. Deliciously complicated, incredibly funny, the work, whether tragic, tender, mysterious or cruel, betrays a profoundly empathic imagination. Both wildly conjured and deeply attentive to diverse literary and theatrical traditionsfrom vaudeville and Greek mythology to the Bible and boulevard comedyGreenspan’s plays ask big questions about history, creation, sexual behavior, the complications of family and the very act of performing a play."

In 2009 he collaborated with Stephin Merritt of The Magnetic Fields in a musical adaptation of Neil Gaiman's Coraline, under the direction of Leigh Silverman. In an interview with Lizzie Olesker in The Brooklyn Rail, Greenspan describes the musical: "We suggest things. Not like a large animated musical. There’s no amplification of our voices. We wanted something that was more direct and immediate as opposed to something coming out of a wall of sound."

List of works

Theater
The Horizontal And The Vertical, world premiere HOME for Contemporary Theatre and Art, NYC, 1986
Dig A Hole And Bury You Father, world premiere HOME for Contemporary Theatre and Art, NYC, 1987
Jack, world premiere HOME for Contemporary Theatre and Art, NYC, 1987
Principa, world premiere HOME for Contemporary Theatre and Art, NYC, 1988
The Home Show Pieces, world premiere HOME for Contemporary Theatre and Art, NYC, 1988
2 Samuel 11, Etc., world premiere HOME for Contemporary Theatre and Art, NYC, 1989
Dead Mother, Or Shirley Not All In Vain, world premiere NYSF/Public Theater, 1991
Dog In A Dancing School, world premiere Dance Theater Workshop, NYC, 1993
Son Of An Engineer, world premiere HERE Arts Center, NYC, 1993
Start From Scratch, world premiere New Renaissance @ Greenwich House, NYC, 1993
Them, world premiere Actors Theater of Louisville, 1993
Only Beauty, reading NYSF/The Public Theater, NYC, 1997
Five Frozen Embryos, world premiere New York Fringe Festival, 2002
She Stoops To Comedy, world premiere Playwrights Horizons, NYC, 2003
The Argument, world premiere Target Margin Theater, NYC, 2007
Old Comedy From Aristophanes' Frogs, world premiere Target Margin Theater, NYC, 2008
Coraline, world premiere Manhattan Class Company, NYC, 2009
The Myopia, an epic burlesque of tragic proportion, world premiere The Foundry Theatre, NYC, 2010
Go Back To Where You Are, world premiere Playwrights Horizons, NYC, 2011
Jump, world premiere Under The Radar Festival - NYSF/Public Theater, NYC, 2011
Jonas, world premiere Transport Group, NYC, 2011
I'm Looking For Helen Twelvetrees, world premiere Abrons Arts Center, NYC 2015
The Bridge of San Luis Rey, world premiere Two River Theater, Red Bank, NJ, 2018

Performance Credits

Theater

 The Bridge of San Luis Rey (2019), Miami New Drama at the Colony Theatre as "Uncle Pio" (also Director)
 Cute Activist (2018), Bushwick Starr as "Landlorde"
 Strange Interlude, Transport Group (solo performance), NYC 2017
 Punk Rock (2014) MCC Theater as "Dr. Richard Harvey"
 A Midsummer Night's Dream (2012) Classic Stage Company as "Francis Flute"
 Go Back to Where You Are (2011) Playwrights Horizons as "Passalus"
 The Patsy (2011) Transport Group (solo performance) NYC

Awards and nominations
 Awards
 2013 Lambda Literary Award for Drama - The Myopia and Other Plays, a collection of five of his plays published by University of Michigan Press in 2012, won a Lambda Literary Award in 2013 in the Drama category.
 2010 Obie Award for Sustained Achievement
 2008 Obie Award Special Citation - The Argument
 2007 Obie Award for Performance - Some Men
 2007 Obie Award for Performance - "Faust"
 2003 Obie Award Special Citation - She Stoops to Comedy
 2002 CalArts//Alpert Awards in the Arts
 1996 Obie Award for Performance - Some Men by Terrence McNally

 Nominations
 2012 Off Broadway Alliance Award Nomination - Best Special Event, The Patsy
 2012 Outer Critics Circle Award Nomination - Outstanding Solo Performance - "The Patsy"
 2008 Drama League Award Nomination - Distinguished Performance Award - Beebo Brinker Chronicles
 2007 Lucille Lortel Award Nomination - Outstanding Featured Actor - Beebo Brinker Chronicles
 2007 Outer Critics Circle Award Nomination - Outstanding Featured Actor in a Play - Beebo Brinker Chronicles

 Fellowships
 An alumnus of New Dramatists, he has received playwriting fellowships from the John Simon Guggenheim Memorial Foundation, Jerome Foundation, Joyce Mertz-Gilmore Foundation and Charles Revson Foundation. He received the 1993 McKnight Fellowship from the Playwrights Center and a 2006 Lucille Lortel Foundation Fellowship.

Bibliography
 She Stoops to Comedy by David Greenspan, Samuel French, Inc., October 2013
 The Myopia and Other Plays, University of Michigan Press, 2012
 Four Plays and a Monologue, No Passport Press, 2012
 Go Back to Where You Are by David Greeenspan    Playwrights Horizons, 2011
 She Stoops To Comedy in Plays From Playwrights Horizons, Vol 2, Broadway Play Publishing Inc., 2010
 "Play: A Journal of Plays, Vol. 3", 2007
 Son of an Engineer, Sun and Moon Press, 2000

Interviews

 Borinsky, Alexander. "David Greenspan. And his Little Dog, Too" "The Brooklyn Rail" (March 2015)
 CFR Staff. David Greenspan on David Greenspan" The Clyde Fitch Report" (May 22, 2013)
 Charles McNulty. "Theatricalizing Theory: A Conversation with the Inimitable David Greenspan" Los Angeles Times (November 9, 2011)
 Raymond, Gerard. "Staging Solos: An Interview with David Greenspan" "Slant Magazine" (July 2011)
 Olesker, Lizzie. "The Power of Suggestion: David Greenspan" "The Brooklyn Rail" (May 2009)

References

External links

David Greenspan profile at the New York Times
Bomb Magazine Interview

1956 births
Living people
Obie Award recipients
American male stage actors
20th-century American dramatists and playwrights
Lambda Literary Award for Drama winners
American gay writers
American LGBT dramatists and playwrights
American male dramatists and playwrights
21st-century American dramatists and playwrights
20th-century American male writers
21st-century American male writers
21st-century LGBT people